Decree Law 3,199 is a decree-law enacted on April 14, 1941, by Getúlio Vargas establishing the bases of the organization of sport throughout Brazil. It is through this, for example, that the National Sports Council was created. This decree also mainly limited the sports arrangements of women, hindering for example the practice of women's football in Brazil. This decree-law was in force until 1979.

Impact on Women & Public Response 
Promulgated by Brazil's National Sports Council (Conselho Nacional de Desportos, or "CND"), Decree Law 3199 effectively prohibited Brazilian women from participating in organized sports of any kind, including but not limited to track, baseball, rugby, polo, boxing, and—perhaps most significantly—soccer. Soccer ("football," outside of the United States) has historically played a central role in Latin American culture, and the exclusion of women from organized sports essentially excluded them from an important facet of the Brazilian identity.

Governing bodies supported the Decree based on misogynistic ideas of conventional femininity. Brazilian President Getúlio Vargas painted a picture of these sports as "too violent" and "not suitable to the female body." Government officials later cited alleged health concerns surrounding women's involvement in sports, noting that it had the potential to stunt their sexual development. In 1944, physical education journal Revista Brasileira de Educação went so far as to warn that too many muscles would ruin female players' attractiveness. The CND's then-president General Newton Cavalcanti asserted that women's participation in sports was "incompatible with their nature."

Though the Decree formally prohibited women from participating in sports, ultimately women still continued to play privately, noting that it "didn’t kill participation in the sport, it just drove it away from watchful eye." It was eventually repealed in 1979.

See also
 Brazil women's national football team

References

Sport in Brazil